Sergiu Grițuc (born 6 April 1984, Tiraspol, Moldavian SSR) is a Moldavian football striker who plays for FC Costuleni.

Club statistics
Total matches played in Moldavian First League: 82 matches – 11 goals

References

External links

Profile at Divizia Nationala
Profile at sports.md

1984 births
People from Tiraspol
Moldovan footballers
Living people
Association football forwards
CS Tiligul-Tiras Tiraspol players
FC Nistru Otaci players
FC Costuleni players